Winston Stona (1940 – 23 August 2022) was a Jamaican actor and businessman. He had roles in Cool Runnings (1993), The Harder They Come (1972), The Lunatic (1991), and One Love (2003). He was the co-founder of Busha Browne Company. 

Stona died on 23 August 2022. He was 82.

Filmography 
 1972: The Harder They Come: Detective Ray Jones
 1991: The Lunatic: Linstrom
 1993: Cool Runnings: Mr. Barrington Coolidge
 2003: One Love: Pastor Johnson 
 2006: No Place Like Home: Winston

References

External links 

 

1940 births
2022 deaths
Place of birth missing
20th-century Jamaican male actors
21st-century Jamaican male actors
Jamaican businesspeople
Jamaican male film actors